is a Japanese footballer currently playing as a defender for Tochigi SC, on loan from Matsumoto Yamaga.

Career statistics

Club
.

Notes

References

External links

1996 births
Living people
Sportspeople from Saitama Prefecture
Association football people from Saitama Prefecture
Tokyo University of Agriculture alumni
Japanese footballers
Association football defenders
J3 League players
J2 League players
Thespakusatsu Gunma players
Matsumoto Yamaga FC players
Tochigi SC players